PSS Remeliik is a , designed and built in Australia, and donated to Palau, to help the nation patrol its exclusive economic zone.

After the agreement Pacific Forum meetings triggered Australia to design a class of small patrol boats to give to twelve small nations, including Palau, that were suddenly dwarfed by their EEZs.  

Operational history

In February 2016 The New York Times Magazine published an account of Remeliik pursuit and boarding of Shin Jyi Chyuu, what the article called a "Taiwanese pirate ship." In December Remeliik seized a vessel authorities described as the mother ship for a squadron of smaller poaching vessels.  They found the mother ship using an "aggregation device" and holding 30 tons of illicitly caught fish in her holds. The mother ship had no fishing license, and had kept no catch log.  

In March 2018 Remeliik intercepted a Filipino fishing vessel engaged in poaching.  Normally poachers are set free after confiscating their catch, but, in this case, the fishing vessel suffered engine failure, and the poachers crew had to be rescued.

Retirement
The vessel's retired ceremony was held on March 13, 2020 at the Melusch Melachel, Malakal Island.

Remeliik is scheduled to be replaced by the larger and more capable  in June 2020.

See also

References

Pacific Forum class patrol vessels
Naval ships of Palau
1996 ships